Papilio esperanza, known as the esperanza swallowtail or Oaxacan swallowtail, is a species of butterfly in the family Papilionidae. It is endemic to Mexico.  The Oaxacan swallowtail is one of Mexico's rarest butterflies and is considered Endangered by The IUCN red list of threatened species. The species is threatened by destruction of habitat but its main concern is poaching for specimens.

References

External links
ARKive Papilio esperanza Images
Butterfly corner Images from Naturhistorisches Museum Wien

esperenza
Butterflies of North America
Endemic Lepidoptera of Mexico
Butterflies described in 1975
Taxonomy articles created by Polbot